Malignant edema (or malignant oedema) is an acute, generally rapidly fatal wound infection (toxemia) most common in grazing animals. It affects cattle, horses, sheep, goats, pigs, and deer. It is caused by one or more species of bacteria in the genus Clostridium.

"A similar infection in humans is not uncommon."

References

Ruminant diseases
Animal bacterial diseases
Swine diseases